See also Project High Wire upgrades on F-100s

Project High Wire was a United States Air Force (USAF) modernization programme for selected North American Aviation F-100C, D and F Super Sabres that were still in active inventory. It consisted of two detailed modification groups: significant electrical rewiring upgrade, and heavy aircraft maintenance and IRAN (inspect and repair as necessary) upgrade. These upgrades began in 1962.

Rewiring upgrade operation consisted of replacing old wiring and harnesses with improved maintainable designs while heavy maintenance and IRAN included new kits, modifications, standardized configurations, repairs, replacements and complete refurbishment.

F-100Cs 
Source: USAF F-100C Super Sabre - Flight Manual - Technical Order Upgrades T.O. 1F-100C(I)-1S-65 2 February 1971 

The F-100Cs first saw action in March 1954 before officially entering USAF service on 14 July 1955 with the 450th Fighter Wing, Foster AFB. The aircraft was known for its efficacy as a platform for nuclear toss bombing due to its high top speed, although it shared a number of flaws with the F-100As. Key changes introduced by the modification program included changes in maintenance procedures, major wiring harnesses, IRANi upgrade, and additional avionics. By 1968, Project High Wire implemented the following upgrades:

 Improved nose gear ground safety lock instructions
 Restriction on takeoff with partially filled . drop tanks
 Improved use of braking system with thermal expansion after high altitudes to prevent excessive pressures and system failures.
 Improve instructions on all ejection seat systems at low altitude bailouts

The modernization programme adopted in 1970 involved 3 simultaneous operations: an electrical rewiring operation, and a heavy maintenance improvements and IRAN operations.  Also including design changes, safety instructions, aircraft characteristics, normal and emergency operations, and overall aircraft and documentation standardization.

List of changes and rescinded(R) 

 Loose strap end securing
 Main gear tire failure landings
 g limitations - R
 Spin recovery and canopy warning light
 Additional information on external store index system
 Oxygen mask hose rerouting
 Warning light on fuel shutoff switch – R
 Additional loading configuration for Mk-82 and Snakeye I (Mk-82 w/drag fins) bombs
 "CAUTION" note on tail skid
 In-flight refueling ready light
 Addition stores index numbers
 Landing pattern usage
 A/A37U-15 Tow Target index numbers
 Turn-and-slip indicator information
 Additional store information
 Store index numbers for MK-82 bomb with  fuze extender
 Store index numbers  for Destructor M117D
 Dispensing of C/B munitions – R
 Store index numbers airspeed limits for CBU-24
 Bomb arming switch information
 Salvo of armed bombs
 Flight limits for BLU-52/B bomb (chemical)
 BLU-32/B Fire Bomb un-finned
 Modification of oil pressure relief valve
 Information of AIM-9E air-to-air missile
 90 degree rotation of A/ARC-34
 Information of SUU-20/A Practice Dispenser
 Relocation of sight selector unit
 Installation of data recording system

1970 High Wire Supplementals 

 High stresses in the N2 Compressor of the J57-21, -21A engines
 Installation of in-flight refueling probe extension
 Installation of AIM-9B provisions
 Installation of true airspeed indicator
 Provisions for in-flight refueling of external tanks
 Installation of EPR system
 Installation of ILS AN/ARN-31 system
 Removal of supplementary oil tank
 Standardization of takeoff trim setting
 90 degree rotation of AN/ARC-34
 installation of canopy breakaway tool
 modification of dispenser and rocket system
 installation of variable intensity light control
 automatic electrical caging – A-4 sight
 deactivation of attitude indication system during ground maintenance
 installation of fuel system shutoff valve fail light
 installation of relay in gun camera circuitry
 installation of exterior floodlights
 installation of data recording equipment
 installation of cockpit selectable hi-lo drag bomb capability
 installation of anticollision lights
 relocation of variable rocket depression unit
 automatic throttle positioning in case of throttle linkage failure
 modification of fuel control and addition of extended range afterburner
 modification of engine fuel pump transfer valve
 modification of oil pressure relief valve

1971 High Wire Supplementals 
 Information on arresting systems and approach end engagements
 Information of fuel system shutoff valve
 Flight limits on SUU-20/A practice dispensers with BDU-33/B, -33A/B, -33B/B bombs
 Information on SUU-20 series
 Information on LAU-3 Rocket Launcher
 Operating procedures on HBU-2B/A Lap Belt
 Information on minimum altitude of attempting an air start
 Information on wind-blast injury during ejections
 High stresses in the N2 Compressor
 Information on pitch damper system deactivation

Block Numbers for C-model High Wire Mods 
Project High Wire modifications were extensive and dictated a change in the block number assignment, i.e.: F-100C-10-NH to F-100C-11-NH

Block No.s.......S/N Range......................Block number change
  F-100C-1-NA .... AF 53-1709 to –1778 ... F-100C-2-NA
 and 54-1740 to –1769
  F-100C-6-NA .... AF 54-1770 to –1814
  F-100C-11-NH ... AF 55-2709 to –2733
  F-100C-16-NA ... AF 54-1615 to –1859
  F-100C-21-NA ... AF 54-1860 to –1969
  F-100C-26-NA ... AF 54-1970 to –2120

Note: NA – Los Angeles, CA  and   NH – Columbus, OH

F-100Ds and Fs 
Source: USAF F-100D,F Super Sabre - Flight Manual - Technical Order: 1F-100D(I)-1S-120 dated 12 January 1970

The F-100D was also a fighter-bomber but an improved version of the F-100C. One of its notable features was the wing outfitted with an increased root chord, which expanded the total wing area to 400.18 square feet. It also has landing flaps, which gave the aircraft its crank-wing trailing edge - one of its distinguishing features. While the aircraft's first aerial demonstration performance ended in disaster after the plane exploded, it still went on to become the most celebrated and widely produced variant of the F-100.

Project Highwire modified approximately 700 F-100D models. The changes required all new manuals (TOs)a and incremented (i.e. -85 to -86) block numbers. All later production models, especially the F models, included earlier High Wire mods. New manuals included colored illustrations.

Base Project High Wire 
This upgrade was to provide aircrew information on aircraft for installation of Data 
recorder (DR) equipment. DR is to record basic information on flight conditions i.e., 
velocity, G-force, and altitude. This data will be used to study the results of various mission requirements and determine the effects on the fatigue life of the aircraft structures: 
 VGHb A/A24U-10 Recorder
 Magnetic tape media
 Records during gun firing, store release, in-flight refueling, change in nose gear load switch position
 Powered by the primary bus
 TRK-77/A24U Accelerometer
 VGH REC/LDG POS CONTROL, no cockpit controls

Other 1970 changes 
 Includes previous T.O. -1S-nnn supplemental upgrades, as nnn listed below:
 -119 Relocation of Sight Selector Unit and relocation of Variable Rocket Depression Unit
 -118 Information on ECM Pod QRCc-160-8 (AN/ALQ-87)
 -117 Information on variety of ordnance and special stores
 -116 Classified
 -115 For F-100Fs
 -114 Classified
 -112 Modified Oil Pressure Relief Valve for J-57
 -111 Relocation of Fuel Boost Pump and test switch
 -110 CBU-42/A authorization
 -109 BLU-32/B Firebomb Unfinned
 -108 Information on CBU-37/A

Initial High Wire Upgrades 
 31 August 1967 - 15 December 1969
A modernization programme of 2 simultaneous operations: an electrical rewiring 
operation, and a heavy maintenance improvements and IRAN operations. Also 
including design changes, safety instructions, aircraft characteristics, normal and 
emergency operations, and overall aircraft and documentation standardization. 
List of changes and rescinded(R): 
 Loose strap end securing
 Main gear tire failure landings
 G limitations - R
 Spin recovery and canopy warning light
 Additional information on external store index system
 Oxygen mask hose rerouting
 Warning light on fuel shutoff switch - R
 Additional loading configuration for MK-82 and Snakeye I Bomb
 CAUTION note on tail skid
 In-flight refueling ready light
 Addition stores index numbers
 Landing pattern usage
 A/A37U-15 Tow Target index numbers
 Turn and slip indicator information
 Additional store information
 Store index numbers for MK-82 with  Fuse Extender
 Store index numbers for Destructor M117D
 Dispensing of C/B munitions - R
 Store index numbers airspeed limits for CBU-24
 Bomb arming switch information
 Salva of armed bombs
 Flight limits for BLU-52/B bomb
 BLU-32/B Fire Bomb un-finned
 Modification of oil pressure relief valve
 Information of AIM-9E air-to-air missile
 90 degree rotation of A/ARC-34
 Information of SUU-20/A Practice Dispenser

1970 High Wire Supplementals 
 F-100 "G" restrictions
 High stresses in the N2 Compressor of the J57-21, -21A engines
 Installation of in-flight refueling probe extension
 Installation of AIM-9B provisions
 Installation of true airspeed indicator
 Provisions for in-flight refueling of external tanks
 Installation of EPR system
 Installation of ILS AN/ARN-31 system
 Removal of supplementary oil tank
 Standardization of takeoff trim setting
 90 degree rotation of AN/ARC-34
 installation of canopy breakaway tool
 modification of dispenser and rocket system
 installation of variable intensity light control
 automatic electrical caging - A-4 sight
 deactivation of attitude indication system during ground maintenance
 installation of fuel system shutoff valve fail light
 installation of relay in gun camera circuitry
 installation of exterior floodlights
 installation of data recording equipment
 installation of cockpit selectable hi-lo drag bomb capability
 installation of anticollision lights
 relocation of variable rocket depression unit
 automatic throttle positioning in case of throttle linkage failure
 modification of fuel control and addition of extended range afterburner
 modification of engine fuel pump transfer valve
 modification of oil pressure relief valve

1971 High Wire Supplementals 
 Information on arresting systems and approach end engagements
 Information of fuel system shutoff valve
 Flight limits on SUU-20/A practice dispensers with BDU-33/B, -33A/B, -33B/B bombs
 Information on SUU-20 series
 Information on LAU-3 Rocket Launcher
 Operating procedures on HBU-2B/A Lap Belt
 Information on minimum altitude of attempting an air start
 Information on wind-blast injury during ejections
 High stresses in the N2 Compressor
 Information on pitch damper system deactivation

Block Numbers for D-model High Wire Mods 
D-model High Wire modifications were also performed on A-models and previously upgraded C-models. Most D-model modifications mandated the change in the block number of the aircraft; thus increasing the block number by one unit value, i.e.: F-100D-10-NH to F-100D-11-NH.

Serial Number Information:
Block No.s......S/N Range......Block number change
YF-100A-NA....52-5754/55
F-100A-01-NA 52-5756 ~ 5765
F-100A-05-NA 52-5766 ~ 5778
F-100A-10-NA 53-1529 ~ 1568
F-100A-15-NA 53-1569 ~ 1608
F-100A-20-NA 53-1609 ~ 1708
F-100C-01-NA 53-1709 ~ 1778..F-100C-02-NA    (See F-100C High Wire Descriptions)
F-100C-05-NA 54-1740 ~ 1769..F-100C-06-NA
F-100C-10-NA 54-1770 ~ 1814..F-100C-11-NA
F-100C-15-NA 54-1815 ~ 1859..F-100C-16-NA
F-100C-20-NA 54-1860 ~ 1970..F-100C-21-NA
F-100C-25-NA 54-1971 ~ 2120..F-100C-26-NA
F-100C-10-NH 55-2709 ~ 2733..F-100C-11-NA
F-100D-01-NA 54-2121 ~ 2132
F-100D-05-NA 54-2133 ~ 2151
F-100D-10-NA 54-2152 ~ 2221
F-100D-15-NA 54-2222 ~ 2303
F-100D-20-NA 55-3501 ~ 3601
F-100D-25-NA 55-3602 ~ 3701..F-100D-26-NA
F-100D-30-NA 55-3702 ~ 3814..F-100D-31-NA
F-100D-35-NH 55-2734 ~ 2743
F-100D-40-NH 55-2744 ~ 2783
F-100D-45-NH 55-2784 ~ 2863..F-100D-46-NA
F-100D-50-NH 55-2864 ~ 2908..F-100D-51-NA
F-100D-55-NH 55-2909 ~ 2954..F-100D-56-NA
F-100D-60-NA 56-2903 ~ 2963..F-100D-61-NA
F-100D-65-NA 56-2963 ~ 3022..F-100D-66-NA
F-100D-70-NA 56-3023 ~ 3142..F-100D-71-NA
F-100D-75-NA 56-3143 ~ 3198..F-100D-76-NA
F-100D-80-NH 56-3351 ~ 3378..F-100D-81-NA
F-100D-85-NH 56-3379 ~ 3463..F-100D-86-NA
F-100D-90-NA 56-3199 ~ 3346..F-100D-91-NA
F-100F-01-NA 56-3725 ~ 3739..F-100F-02
F-100F-05-NA 56-3740 ~ 3769..F-100F-06
F-100F-10-NA 56-3770 ~ 3919..F-100F-11
F-100F-15-NA 56-3920 ~ 4019..F-100F-16..(~4016)
58-6975 ~ 6983
59-2558 ~ 2563
F-100F-20-NA 58-1205 ~ 1233..F-100F-21
Total Production 2,294

Note: NA - Los Angeles, CA and NH - Columbus, OH

See also 
 CAMPS Civil Aircraft Missile Protection System
 Electronic warfare
 Electronic countermeasures

Related ECMs 
 AN/ALQ-99
 AN/ALQ-128
 AN/ALQ-144

Footnotes
i. IRAN - Inspection and repair as necessary
a. TO - Technical Orders
b. VGH - Velocity-Gravity-Height
c. QRC - QuickReaction Capability
d.

References

 USAF F-100C Super Sabre - Flight Manual - Technical Order: 1F-100C(I)-1S-65; 2 February 1971
 USAF F-100D Super Sabre - Flight Manual - Technical Order: 1F-100D(I)-1S-120; 12 January 1970

External links
 ThirdWire.com: F-100 Project High Wire

Projects of the United States Air Force